The Toronto Rock are a lacrosse team based in Toronto playing in the National Lacrosse League (NLL).  The 2008 season was the 12th in franchise history, and 11th as the Rock.

The 2008 season almost never happened. On October 16, 2007 the league released a statement officially cancelling the season, after no agreement could be reached on a new collective bargaining agreement. However, negotiations continued, and on October 25, the league announced that a new CBA has been agreed on, and that the season would proceed. The new revised schedule was released on November 2, 2007, but only included 12 of the expected 14 teams were included. The expansion Boston Blazers and 2007 Western division champion Arizona Sting had decided for "a number of business reasons" to opt out of the 2008 season and return in 2009.  Due to the short time frame between the agreement on a new CBA and the start of the season, the New York Titans were unable to secure 8 home dates for the revised schedule, and thus both the Toronto Rock and Buffalo Bandits hosted a Titans home game in their own arena.

The Rock had their second consecutive sub-.500 season, finishing 7–9, and out of the playoffs for the first time since they were the Ontario Raiders in 1998. Despite the losing season, veteran Bob Watson was named NLL Goaltender of the Year.

This was captain Jim Veltman's final season as a player; he retired after 16 seasons and joined the Rock coaching staff in 2009.

Regular season

Conference standings

Game log
Reference:

Player stats
Reference:

Runners (Top 10)

Note: GP = Games played; G = Goals; A = Assists; Pts = Points; LB = Loose balls; PIM = Penalty minutes

Goaltenders
Note: GP = Games played; MIN = Minutes; W = Wins; L = Losses; GA = Goals against; Sv% = Save percentage; GAA = Goals against average

Awards

Transactions

Trades

Roster
Reference:

See also
2008 NLL season

References

Toronto Rock season
Toronto Rock season
Toronto Rock season